Mildam is a village in Heerenveen in the province of Friesland, the Netherlands. It had a population of around 685 in January 2017.

Louis Le Roy's "eco-cathedral" is located here. There is a windmill in the village, De Tjongermolen.

History
The village was first mentioned in 1523 as tho Meyledam, and either means middle dam or dam of Meila (person). Mildam developed in the 18th century near a place where the  river could be crossed. Nowadays, it is more of a suburb of Heerenveen. The current Dutch Reformed church was rebuilt in 1726. In 1840, Mildam was home to 297 people.

The Tjongermolen is a polder mill built in 1983 to replace a ruinous mill from 1869.

Before 1934, Mildam was part of the Schoterland municipality.

Gallery

References

External links

Populated places in Friesland
Heerenveen